Luke Witte (born October 19, 1950) is a retired American college and professional basketball player who is now a church minister.  He played at the collegiate level for Ohio State University and professionally for the Cleveland Cavaliers.  It was during his time at Ohio State that he was severely injured in one of the more brutal on-court brawls in basketball history.

High school and college
Witte was a standout player at Marlington High School in Alliance, Ohio, where he scored over 1500 points during his career.

He went on to the Ohio State University, where, as a sophomore, in 1971 led the team in rebounds (331 for the season) and was all-Big Ten.  The Ohio State team were Big Ten champions, and teamed with fellow Buckeye standouts Allan Hornyak and Jim Cleamons.  The 1971 Ohio State team defeated Marquette in the NCAA Tournament Mid-East regional semifinal before losing to Western Kentucky.

Brawl in Minnesota
Witte is best known for the incident at the Ohio State–Minnesota game, played at Minnesota on January 25, 1972.  According to the Big Ten Conference's review of the game film, Witte appeared to elbow Minnesota guard Bobby Nix as the two teams headed to their locker rooms at halftime. During the second half, Ohio State led 50-44 with 36 seconds to go when Witte went for a layup but was fouled hard.  Immediately following the foul, Minnesota player Corky Taylor extended an arm to help Witte up, then kneed Witte in the groin and punched him in the head.  While on the floor, he was also kicked and stomped by Minnesota player Ron Behagen, knocking him unconscious.

What followed was an extended brawl.  Witte's teammate, Dave Merchant, attempted to come to his aid, but was struck in the face several times by Gopher Jim Brewer. Another Buckeye, Mark Wagar (currently the president of Empire BlueCross BlueShield in New York), was attacked from behind by Minnesota player—and future Major League Baseball Hall of Famer—Dave Winfield, who landed four or five punches to Wagar's head.

When order was restored, Minnesota Athletic Director Paul Giel announced the game was over and the Buckeyes were a 50-44 victor, prompting Minnesota fans to boo and throw objects as Witte was carried from the floor. Hospitalized for several days, including 24 hours in intensive care, Witte's injuries included 29 facial stitches and a scarred cornea.  In all, three Ohio State players were taken to hospitals.

Aftermath
The Big Ten Conference suspended Taylor and Behagen for the rest of the season.  Ohio State head coach Fred Taylor was angered that the universities (including his own), the NCAA, and the Big Ten Conference refused to pursue sanctions against the Minnesota program, and said later that his enthusiasm for the game was lost as a result; he retired early, in 1976.  The Minnesota coach, Bill Musselman, was blamed for fostering a thuggish Gopher atmosphere—for instance, he had his team perform dunks and slams during pre-game workouts.  Musselman denied that he ordered his team to play dirty or to initiate fights.  Despite losing two of its key players, Minnesota went on to win the Big Ten championship with an 11-3 record.

Following the incident, the NCAA banned the practice of players performing dunks and slams during pre-game warm-ups when officials are not present. Witte chose not to pursue legal or any other avenue of retribution against his attackers. Instead, he has extended forgiveness and tried to achieve reconciliation.

Pro career
Witte was selected in the fourth round of the 1973 NBA Draft by the Cleveland Cavaliers, who also had fellow Buckeyes Hornyak and Jim Cleamons. Minnesota fight participant, Jim Brewer was on the team as well. He still suffered from vision impairment as well.

After basketball
Following his career in professional basketball, Luke Witte established his own sporting store in Alliance, Ohio which he operated for more than five years before becoming a minister. Luke Witte is now the Carolinas Division Director with Marketplace Chaplains in Charlotte, North Carolina.

References

External links

 Luke Witte career statistics at basketball-reference.com
  Luke Witte stats page at NBA.com

Sources
 "Brawl of 35 years ago serves as a warning today", Columbus Dispatch, January 25, 2007
 "Forgiveness," by Dr. Stephen Pattison, Capital City Christian Church Sermons: April 16-17, 2005
 "Parshat Vayechi," by Rabbi Jessica Spitalnic Brockman, Temple Beth El of Boca Paton: December 21, 2002

1950 births
Living people
American Presbyterian ministers
Basketball players at the 1971 Pan American Games
Basketball players from Ohio
Centers (basketball)
Cleveland Cavaliers draft picks
Cleveland Cavaliers players
Ohio State Buckeyes men's basketball players
People from Alliance, Ohio
Basketball players from Charlotte, North Carolina
American men's basketball players
Pan American Games competitors for the United States
Basketball players from Philadelphia